Notman may refer to:

People
 Alex Notman (born 1979), Scottish football player
 John Notman (1810–1865), Scottish-born American architect who settled in Philadelphia, Pennsylvania
 William Notman (disambiguation), multiple people, including:
William Notman (1826–1891), Canadian photographer and businessman
William Notman (politician) Q.C. (1805–1865), lawyer and political figure in Canada West
William Notman (architect) (1809–1893), Scottish architect

Other uses
Notman Bridge, historic concrete arch bridge over the Ausable River at Keene Valley in Essex County, New York
Notman House, historic building in Montreal, Quebec
Notman Photographic Archives, archive of photographic images originally collected by photographer William Notman
Not Man, a mascot sometimes used by the American heavy metal band Anthrax

See also
 Harold Nottman (1917–2008), New Zealand cricketer
 Kevin Noteman (born 1969), English footballer

fr:Notman